Durlasy  is a village in the administrative district of Gmina Lelis, within Ostrołęka County, Masovian Voivodeship, in east-central Poland.

References

Durlasy
Łomża Governorate
Warsaw Voivodeship (1919–1939)